The  Jacksonville Sharks season is the sixth season for the franchise in the Arena Football League. The team is coached by Les Moss and play their home games at the Jacksonville Veterans Memorial Arena. The Sharks finished 10-8 and qualified for the playoffs after missing out for the first time in franchise history the previous year.

Standings

Schedule

Regular season
The 2015 regular season schedule was released on December 19, 2014.

Playoffs

Roster

References

Jacksonville Sharks
Jacksonville Sharks seasons
Jacksonville Sharks